Mexico sent a delegation to compete at the 2004 Summer Paralympics in Athens.

Medallists

Sports

Archery

|-
|align=left|Jose Antonio Baet Tellez
|align=left|Men's individual W2
|564
|26
|N/A
|L 146-157
|colspan=4|did not advance
|}

Athletics

Men's track

Men's field

Women's track

Women's field

Powerlifting

Men

Women

Swimming

Men

Women

Table tennis

Men

Women

Wheelchair basketball
The women's basketball team didn't win any medals: they were 6th out 8 teams.

Players
Rosa Elizabeth Camara Arango
Yolanda Calderon Duran
Rosa Elizabeth Vera Gallardo
Wendy Garcia Amador
Rubicela Guzman Acosta
Lupita Madrigal Cruz
Maria Montano Mejia
Leticia Penaloza Serrano
Romy Rodriguez Velaquez
Rocio Dolores Torres Lopez
Lucia Vazquez Delgadillo
Cecilia Vazquez Suarez
Coach
Aarón Dávila García

Results

See also
2004 Summer Paralympics
Mexico at the 2004 Summer Olympics

Nations at the 2004 Summer Paralympics
2004
Paralympics